Harry Potter: Hogwarts Mystery is a role-playing video game developed and published by Jam City under license from Portkey Games. The game is set in the Wizarding World and based on the Harry Potter novels written by J.K. Rowling. Hogwarts Mystery follows a player character entering the fictional school of Hogwarts and is set before the events of the novels. The game released on 25 April 2018 for Android and iOS devices. Many of the actors from the Harry Potter film series provided their voices for the game.

The game received generally negative reviews from critics. Reviewers noted the game's use of the Wizarding World to be a positive, but many were highly critical of the microtransactions present. These transactions, especially those used to regain the in-game energy system, were near-universally panned. The game has grossed an estimated $110 million as of March 2019.

Gameplay and premise

Harry Potter: Hogwarts Mystery is a role-playing video game set in the Harry Potter universe established by J. K. Rowling's series of novels. The game is set between Harry Potter's birth and his enrollment at Hogwarts. The game revolves around the player character's journey through life at the school. They can attend magic classes, learn spells, battle rivals, date characters, play quiddich and embark on quests. Through the game's encounter system, players make choices that affect the game's narrative, though sometimes these choices are locked if the player's statistics are not high enough. Players can interact with characters from the series, such as Albus Dumbledore, Rubeus Hagrid and Severus Snape.

"Energy" is used to perform tasks throughout the game, which regenerate over time. Players tap on the screen to move the character between places. The player also gains different levels of courage, empathy, and knowledge by making choices in game, with higher levels of a particular attribute allowing the player to choose some different dialogue options in game and change interactions with other students and staff.

Plot

The player is a young witch or wizard who is set to attend Hogwarts school of Witchcraft and Wizardry. The player-character meets Rowan Khanna who teaches the player about the wizarding world. A conversation with Ollivander reveals that the player's brother, Jacob, was expelled from Hogwarts for attempting to open the "Cursed Vaults", hidden areas rumoured to have existed at the school. During a potions lesson, the player character is reprimanded after a student named Merula Snyde sabotages the character's cauldron. Merula leads the player into a room with Devil's Snare, a large maneating plant, where they escape. Finding a vault surrounded by ice, along with companions, they get trapped in ice but escape to find this was one of cursed vaults, but was unable to open.

During the school's second year, Rowan and Bill Weasley are attacked by the ice, ending up in the hospital wing. The trio recover, open the cursed vault and defeat an ice knight protecting the vault. in the vault, there is a broken wand and a book, both of which belong to Jacob. This gives them information on additional vaults on the grounds.

Using the tools, they find a door to a room in which Jacob used to hide secrets. This gave the location of the second Cursed Vault, located within the Restricted Section of the library. In the vault, they defeat boggarts taking the form of Lord Voldemort. Using the broken wand found in the first Vault, the player opens the second to find a broken arrow and a map of the Forbidden Forest.

With two vaults opened, school staff bring in help from professional curse-breaker, Patricia Rakepick, to find and open the remaining vaults. Some students are found sleepwalking toward the third vault, a curse given by the vault. After the player enters the third vault, they find a small sweater and a portrait of a dragon.

The fourth curse is unleashed the following year with students being found trapped inside portraits starting with the younger sister of Penny Haywood, one of the player character's closest friends. This makes the player character especially determined to break the curse and accepted, along with their friends, mentorship under Rakepick to learn the spells they would need to use. During this year, the player character is told during a meeting with Professors Dumbledore and Snape that they are a legilimens and learns to control and harness this power along with occlumency. After recovering a portrait portkey, the player character along with three friends, Merula and Rakepick are transported into an underground vault where they battle a Hungarian Horntail dragon. After opening the door using the player character's legilimency, Rakepick betrays the students threatening to kill them before the player character stops her using garroting gas making her flee by disapparating. In the room beyond, the player character finds Jacob trapped in a portrait who is freed, along with the trapped students at Hogwarts, upon breaking the curse. Jacob disapparates to go after Rakepick and the group returns to Hogwarts using another portrait portkey they found in the vault along with a Merperson trident.

In the sixth year, the curse of the final vault is unleashed turning several students and Madam Pomfrey to stone with the same texture as the Merperson trident. After being lured into the Forbidden Forest by a letter claiming to be giving information to a secret meeting with Jacob, Rakepick battles them then fires a killing curse which hits Rowan who protects Ben. The player character along with friends and allies forms the Circle of Khanna, named in honour of Rowan, to help bring R, a criminal organisation Rakepick is part of, to justice and break the petrification curse. Suspecting the final vault of being in the lake, the group makes a peace offering to the Merpeople who then show them the entrance to the vault where upon touching the casket the player character relives their worst moments in an endless circle until they are freed by their friends. They are then confronted by Rakepick who duels the player character. Upon defeating her, the player is given the choice between turning Rakepick to the authorities or sealing her in the vault where she relives her worst moments under the curse. On their return to Hogwarts, they find the petrification curse is broken and they celebrate. However, Merula who has served as an ally within the Circle of Khanna is seen joining R.

In the seventh year, the students are given work experience placements in the Ministry of Magic and St Mungo's Hospital for Magical Maladies and Injuries. Meanwhile a series of incidents, suspected of being committed by R as distractions, are neutralised by the player character which earns them favour by both the Ministry and St Mungo's. Merula starts to secretly turn against R after her friend Ismelda is hurt by an unleashed wampus cat. After Corey Hayden discovers the identity of R's director, Merula kidnaps Corey to lure Jacob's sibling. Upon touching a portkey while searching the Forbidden Forest with Aurors Jacob's sibling is transported to the Shrieking Shack where they find Merula and Corey along with the Director who is revealed to be Merula's aunt Verucca Buckthorn. Jacob's sibling also meets the leader of R who is revealed to their long-lost father Peregrine. Perigrene claims that R's real aim is to rid the Ministry of Magic of corruption, insisting that Rakepick went rogue and acted for her own gain and hopes that Jacob's sibling will work for R eventually. Peregrine tries to make amends with his children but Jacob is angry about R leaving him trapped in a portrait although Peregrine continues meeting Jacob's sibling. He eventually convinces Jacob, on the promise to reconcile with their mother, to take part in a mind control experiment using a potion brewed to a recipe from a scroll of Japanese wizard Dai Ryuzaki and the Crown of Mneme recovered from the Sunken Vault. The player character arrives at the Shrieking Shack with a friend to try to retrive the crown but Peregrine catches the friend in the act insisting they would be a suitable test subject. Jacob feels the curse of the Sunken Vault, which has tainted the crown, and tries to resist but hurts the friend before he can get the crown off. Peregrine is disappointed and blurts out his intention of taking over the Ministry by making them suffer. Jacob turns against him and disapparates to the school gate with the player character and the friend to get them to the Hospital Wing.

Development and release
Harry Potter: Hogwarts Mystery was developed and published by Los Angeles-based mobile video game company Jam City. The game was licensed to Portkey Games, a publishing label established by Warner Bros. Interactive Entertainment to create games based on Harry Potter, with Hogwarts Mystery being the label's debut game. Actors from the Harry Potter film series such as Michael Gambon, Maggie Smith, Gemma Jones, Sally Mortemore, Warwick Davis, and Zoë Wanamaker voice their respective characters from the films.

The game was first announced on 18 January 2018 with a scheduled release on Android and iOS mobile devices on 25 April 2018. The game's release featured many components found in freemium games, such as microtransactions. Following backlash from fans, many of these microtransactions were reduced in price.

Reception

According to review aggregator website Metacritic Harry Potter: Hogwarts Mystery was reviewed "generally unfavourable", receiving an average score of 43 out of 100 based on reviews of 14 critics. Marc Hewitt from GameZebo praised the concept of a Harry Potter mobile game and stated that Hogwarts Mystery "largely lives up to the hype". Christine Chan from App Advice commented that Hogwarts Mystery is a "nice representation" of the world set out in Harry Potter and commended the game for letting her "live out [her] Hogwarts dreams".

However, the frequent enticements to pay real-world money for microtransactions in the game was widely criticised. One notable example highlighted by critics was an early scene in which the player is subject to being strangled by a Devil's Snare, during which their energy is immediately depleted; the player must then either wait around half an hour for energy to replenish or spend real-world money to receive immediate energy instead. The developers later defended the scene in an interview and disregarded suggestions of its controversial nature. GameZebo commented that the "[r]estrictive energy system rears its head early" and commented that game needed greater pacing. Chan from App Advice said the timers and energy system "left a sour taste in [her] mouth." Emily Sowden from Pocket Gamer called the use of free-to-play mechanics "maddening" and described the experience as being "behind a paywall".

Kotaku Gita Jackson also commented on the game's use of these mechanics, saying, "where the game falters, is how it implements its free-to-play elements". Jackson interviewed one user that even took up writing Harry Potter fanfiction because they were unable to play the game as often as they wanted. David Jagnaeux from IGN Africa called it "awful," describing the microtransactions as "gratuitous" and stating that they "actively prevented" him from enjoying the game. Keza MacDonald of The Guardian called Hogwarts Mystery "a dull game with a great concept, made unplayable by its hyper-aggressive monetisation."

The game was awarded Best Science Fiction or Fantasy Mobile Game during the 2018 Dragon Awards. The game was nominated for Best Breakthrough Game during the 2019 Google Play Awards but lost to Marvel Strike Force. By August 2018, the game had grossed . It has grossed an estimated US$110 million as of March 2019.

References

External links
 

Android (operating system) games
Harry Potter video games
IOS games
Role-playing video games
2018 video games
Video games developed in the United States
Video games featuring protagonists of selectable gender
Video games set in 1984
Video games set in 1985
Video games set in 1986
Video games set in 1987
Video games set in 1988
Video games set in 1989
Video games set in 1990
Video games set in 1991
Video games set in castles
Video games set in London
Video games set in Scotland
Single-player video games
Jam City (company) games